Harold Andrews (13 August 1903 – August 1988) was an English footballer who scored 140 goals in 385 appearances in the Football League playing for Lincoln City, Notts County, Barnsley, Luton Town and Accrington Stanley. He played at inside left, centre forward, and left half throughout his career.

References

1903 births
1988 deaths
Sportspeople from Lincoln, England
English footballers
Association football forwards
Lincoln City F.C. players
Notts County F.C. players
Barnsley F.C. players
Luton Town F.C. players
Accrington Stanley F.C. (1891) players
English Football League players
Association football wing halves